Tanjore Vilviah Sambasivam Pillai was a South Indian Tamil scholar in Siddha medicine, a traditional medicine which originated from India. He is known for his Tamil – English Dictionary of Medicine, Chemistry, Botany and Allied Sciences which is considered as one of the major works on Siddha medicine. He did not have any formal training or education in medicine.

Biography
Pillai was born on 19 September 1880 in Bangalore. He was the eldest son of his father Vilviah Manniar and his mother Manonmani  Ammal. He belonged to a family native to Kamuganchenthangudi  village near  Tanjore.  He later migrated to Bangalore. While in Bangalore, due to an epidemic outbreak of plague, his family shifted to their native village but Pillai stayed in Bangalore to continue his education. After schooling, he was appointed as a clerck in the Madras City Police Commissioner’s office. He married Duraikannu  Ammal in 1903. They had five sons however all of them died of various reasons. In 1914, his wife died due to cholera. In 1916, he married again to Ammani Ammal but she died at a childbirth that year. Following depression and to overcome the same, he dedicated himself to study of Siddha medicine. He did not have any formal training or education in medicine. While studying Siddha, he realised that there was no authentic work on the subject in English. So he wrote Tamil – English Dictionary of Medicine, Chemistry, Botany and Allied Sciences, which is considered as one of the major work on Siddha medicine. He died on 12 November  1953.

Recognition
In recognition to his work, the Government of Tamil Nadu sanctioned Rs. 5000 in 1949 as a financial assistance for his research and  provided an accommodation at Triplicane, Chennai. He was also awarded Rs. 5000 each by the University of Madras and Mysore University in recognition of his work. On 30 August 2019, the Government of India issued a commemorative stamp of Rs. 5 in the series of Masters of AYUSH recognizing services of twelve modern masters of Indian systems of medicine.

Works

Pillai spent nearly 16 years collecting material for Tamil – English Dictionary of Medicine, Chemistry, Botany and Allied Sciences. He spent his salary, lands and others assets to collect. In 1938, he compiled and published two volumes of his work at  his  own  expense. He could only publish the third volume partially. The remaining  part was published with partial help from the Government of Tamil Nadu. The fourth and fifth volumes were published in 1977 and 1978 respectively by G. D. Naidu and his son G. D. N. Gopal.

The work provides information about plants, minerals, metals and animals used in the Siddha medicine. The work consists of five volumes spanning 6,537 pages. It contains nearly 80,000 words explained in detail. The work provides synonyms for Tamil words in Latin/English. It also describes and explains any given word with appropriate annotations where required.

It was renamed as The Greatness of Siddha Medicine and was published at the Second World Tamil Conference held in Chennai in 1968.

The work used as the reference work for the B.S.M.S., M.D (Siddha) and Ph. D. studies as well as the reference work for literature research scholars.

References

Siddha medicine
1880 births
1953 deaths